Koeri may refer to
Koeri, an Indian cast
Koeri an uninhabited  village in Estonia
Koeri, Kandilli Observatory and Earthquake Research Institute in Turkey